McCart is a surname. Notable people with the surname include:

Chris McCart (born 1967), Scottish footballer
George McCart (1883–1937), Australian rules footballer
Jamie McCart (born 1997), Scottish footballer
William John McCart (1872–1933), Ontario merchant and politician